Kolm castle is a historical castle located in Badreh County in Ilam Province, The longevity of this fortress dates back to the Medes.

References 

Castles in Iran
Medes castles